Blažice is a village and municipality in Košice-okolie District in the Kosice Region of eastern Slovakia.

History
Historically, the village was first mentioned in 1245.

Geography
It has a population of about 500 people.

Genealogical resources

The records for genealogical research are available at the state archive "Statny Archiv in Kosice, Slovakia"

 Roman Catholic church records (births/marriages/deaths): 1766-1918 (parish B)
 Reformated church records (births/marriages/deaths): 1728-1899 (parish B)

See also
 List of municipalities and towns in Slovakia

External links

Surnames of living people in Blazice

Villages and municipalities in Košice-okolie District